Isabel Pagán (born 24 July 1986) is a Spanish group rhythmic gymnast. She represents her nation at international competitions.  

She participated at the 2004 Summer Olympics in Athens and 2008 Summer Olympics in Beijing. She also competed at world championships, including at the 2005 and 2007  World Rhythmic Gymnastics Championships.

References

External links

1986 births
Living people
Spanish rhythmic gymnasts
Place of birth missing (living people)
Gymnasts at the 2004 Summer Olympics
Gymnasts at the 2008 Summer Olympics
Olympic gymnasts of Spain